Since the vast majority of Latin Americans from Spanish-speaking countries have at least partial Spanish descent, this is a list of important people in Latin America who have at least one parent or two grandparents who were born in Spain.

Artists, photographers and fashion designers
 Humberto Castro (born 1957), Cuban painter
 Carlos Enríquez Gómez (1900–1957), Cuban painter, illustrator and writer of the Vanguardia movement (the Cuban Avant-garde).
 Raúl Martínez (1927–1995), pop artist and Cuban painter
 Mario Perez (born 1943), painter
 Tomás Sánchez (born 1948), Cuban painter

TV and Cinema 
 Angelines Fernández (1922–1994), Spanish actress settled in Mexico.
 Mirtha Legrand (born 1927), Argentine actress and TV host.
 Guillermo del Toro (born 1964), Mexican director and film producer.
 Velia Martínez (1920–1993), American singer and actress.
 Ricardo Montalbán (1920–2009), Mexican actor of Spanish parentage.

Music 
 Miguel Bosé (born 1956), Spanish singer with Colombian citizenship
 Gloria Estefan (born 1957), Cuban singer, all four grandparents born in Spain.
 Juanes (born 1972), Colombian singer, Basque ancestry from his father.
 Ernesto Lecuona (1895–1963), Cuban composer and pianist.
 Ricky Martin (born 1971), Puerto Rican singer, part Catalan ancestry.
 Luis Miguel (born 1970), Puerto Rican by birth, raised in Mexico, Spanish father, Italian mother.
 Shakira (born 1977), Colombian singer, part Catalan ancestry.

Government and military 
 José Gervasio Artigas (1764–1850)
 Simón Bolívar (1783–1830)
 José Núñez de Cáceres (1772–1846) politics and liberator of Dominican Republic
 Juan Carrasco (1878–1922)
 Fidel Castro (1926–2016), Father was an immigrant to Cuba from Galicia and his mother was also of Spanish origin. 
 Manuel Domínguez (1803–1882)
 Juan Manuel Santos (born 1951), President of Colombia
 José Martí (1853–1895)
 Agustín de Iturbide (1783–1824), Liberator of Mexico
 Juan Leal (1676–1742)
 Juan Ponce de León (1474–1521)
 Juan Ponce de León II (1524–1591)
 Francisco de Miranda (1750–1816), Liberator of Venezuela
 José Antonio Páez (1790–1873)
 Carlos Soublette (1789–1870), Libertador of Venezuela
 Antonio José de Sucre (1795–1830)
 Jorge Quiroga (born 1960), President of Bolivia
 Alvaro Garcia Linera (born 1962), Vice President of Bolivia

Writers
 Jorge Luis Borges (1899–1986)
 Pablo Neruda (1904–1973)
 Gabriel García Márquez (1927–2014)

Others 
 Juanita García Peraza (1897–1970), Founder of the "Mita congregation", the only Protestant religion of Puerto Rican origin.

See also 
 Latin Americans
 White Hispanic and Latino Americans
 List of Criollos
 List of Cubans

References

Lists of Spanish people
Spanish